Gaius Julius Civilis was the leader of the Batavian rebellion against the Romans in 69 AD. His nomen shows that he (or one of his male ancestors) was made a Roman citizen (and thus, the tribe a Roman vassal) by either Augustus or Caligula.

Early history
He was twice imprisoned on a charge of rebellion, and narrowly escaped execution. During the disturbances that followed the death of Nero, he took up arms under pretense of siding with Vespasian and induced the inhabitants of his native country to rebel. The Batavians, who had rendered valuable service under the early emperors, had been well treated in order to attach them to the cause of Rome. They were exempt from tribute, but were obliged to supply a large number of men for the army, and the burden of conscription and the oppression of provincial governors were important incentives to revolt. The Batavians were immediately joined by several neighboring Germanic tribes.

Revolt

The Roman garrisons near the Rhine were driven out, and twenty-four ships captured. Two legions under Mummius Lupercus were defeated at Castra Vetera (near the modern Xanten) and surrounded. Eight cohorts of Batavian veterans joined their countrymen, and the troops sent by Vespasian to the relief of Vetera threw in their lot with them.

"Let Syria, Asia Minor, and the East, habituated as it is to despotism, submit to slavery... Freedom is a gift bestowed by nature even on the dumb animals. Courage is the peculiar excellence of man, and the Gods help the braver side."

- Gaius Julius Civilis

The result of these accessions to the forces of Civilis was a rising in Gaul. Hordeonius Flaccus was murdered by his troops (70 AD), and the whole of the Roman forces were induced by two commanders of the Gallic auxiliaries —Julius Classicus and Julius Tutor— to revolt from Rome and join Civilis. The whole of Gaul thus practically declared itself independent, and the foundation of a new kingdom of Gaul was contemplated. The prophetess Veleda predicted the complete success of Civilis and the fall of the Roman Empire. But disputes broke out among the different tribes and rendered co-operation impossible; Vespasian, having successfully ended the civil war, called upon Civilis to lay down his arms, and on his refusal resolved to take strong measures for the suppression of the revolt.

Defeat and surrender
The arrival of Quintus Petillius Cerialis with a strong force awed the Gauls and mutinous troops into submission; Civilis was defeated at Augusta Treverorum (Trier, Trèves) and Castra Vetera, and forced to withdraw to the island of the Batavians. He finally came to an agreement with Cerialis whereby his countrymen obtained certain advantages, and resumed amicable relations with Rome. From this time, Civilis disappears from history.

Notes

References
 This documents that the chief authority for the history of the insurrection is Tacitus, Histories, iv., v., whose account breaks off at the beginning of Civilis's speech to Cerialis.
Josephus, Bellum Judaicum, vii. 4.
E. Meyer, Der Freiheitskrieg der Bataver unter Civilis (1856)
Merivale, Hist. of the Romans under the Empire, ch. 58.
H. Schiller, Geschichte der römischen Kaiserzeit, bk. ii. ch. 2, § 54 (1883).

External links

 Jona Lendering, "The Batavian Revolt" 
 

1st-century monarchs in Europe
1st-century Romans
Ancient Roman generals
Batavian people
Germanic warriors
Defectors
Dutch nobility
Dutch generals
Dutch military commanders
Netherlands in the Roman era
Civilis, Gaius
People of the Year of the Four Emperors